Heliopyrgus domicella, or Erichson's white-skipper, is a species of spread-wing skipper in the butterfly family Hesperiidae. It is found in North America.

The MONA or Hodges number for Heliopyrgus domicella is 3970.

Subspecies
These three subspecies belong to the species Heliopyrgus domicella:
 Heliopyrgus domicella domicella (Erichson, 1849)
 Heliopyrgus domicella margarita Bell, 1937
 Heliopyrgus domicella willi Plötz, 1884

References

Further reading

 

Pyrginae
Articles created by Qbugbot
Butterflies described in 1849